Eminium is a genus of flowering plants in the family Araceae. The genus ranges from Turkey and Egypt east to Central Asia. Usually they can be found growing in barren areas in sand or stony soil. The foliage of Eminium resembles Helicodiceros and its inflorescence and fruit resembles those of Biarum.

Species
Eminium albertii (Regel) Engl. - Turkmenistan, Uzbekistan, Afghanistan
Eminium heterophyllum (Blume) Schott - Iran, Iraq, Turkey
Eminium intortum (Banks & Sol.) Kuntze - Turkey, Syria
Eminium jaegeri Bogner & P.C.Boyce - Iran
Eminium koenenianum Lobin & P.C.Boyce - Turkey
Eminium lehmannii (Bunge) Kuntze - Kazakhstan, Kyrgyzstan, Turkmenistan, Uzbekistan, Afghanistan, Tajikistan
Eminium rauwolffii (Blume) Schott - Turkey, Syria
Eminium regelii Vved.  - Kazakhstan, Kyrgyzstan, Tajikistan, Uzbekistan
Eminium spiculatum (Blume) Schott - Egypt, Israel, Palestine, Jordan, Lebanon, Syria, Iraq, Iran

References

Aroideae
Araceae genera